Florian Kastrati (born 2 July 2002) is an Albanian professional footballer who plays as a midfielder for Bognor Regis Town on loan from Crawley Town.

Career
On 14 December 2021, Kastrati signed his first professional contract with Crawley Town after a successful period with the Crawley Performance Academy and was immediately loaned out to Kings Langley of the Southern League Premier Division Central. He played seven games for Kings Langley. He made his first-team debut for Crawley on 7 May 2022, in a 3–3 draw at Oldham Athletic, having come on as an 87th-minute substitute for James Tilley in the last EFL League Two game of the 2021–22 season. On 11 February 2023, it was announced that Kastrati would join Eastbourne Borough on loan until the end of the season. Kastrati's loan at Borough was cut short when, on 14 March 2023, he was recalled and was immediately sent out on loan again, joining Bognor Regis Town until the end of the season. On his debut for Bognor Kastrati scored five minutes into the game.

Career statistics

References

2002 births
Living people
Albanian footballers
Association football midfielders
Crawley Town F.C. players
Kings Langley F.C. players
Eastbourne Borough F.C. players
Bognor Regis Town F.C. players
Southern Football League players
English Football League players
Isthmian League players
Albanian expatriate footballers
Expatriate footballers in England